Mohammed Sabo (born 1 October 1967) is a Nigerian former amateur boxer. He won a gold medal at the 1990 Commonwealth Games and competed at the 1988 Summer Olympics in Seoul and the 1992 Summer Olympics in Barcelona, where he reached the quarter final.

References

1967 births
Living people
Olympic boxers of Nigeria
Boxers at the 1988 Summer Olympics
Boxers at the 1992 Summer Olympics
Boxers at the 1990 Commonwealth Games
Commonwealth Games gold medallists for Nigeria
Nigerian male boxers
Commonwealth Games medallists in boxing
Bantamweight boxers
20th-century Nigerian people
21st-century Nigerian people
Medallists at the 1990 Commonwealth Games